Never Send Flowers, first published in 1993, was the thirteenth novel by John Gardner featuring Ian Fleming's secret agent, James Bond (including Gardner's novelization of Licence to Kill). Carrying the Glidrose Publications copyright, it was first published in the United Kingdom by Hodder & Stoughton and in the United States by Putnam.

Plot summary
A murder in Switzerland of Laura March with MI5 connections follows assassinations in Rome, London, Paris & Washington. Left at each scene is a rose with marks of drops of blood on the petal. Bond is sent to investigate where he meets the lovely Swiss agent Fredericka von Grüsse whom he later calls Flicka when on better terms.

Trails lead to a former international stage actor, David Dragonpol, a friend of March who lives in a castle on the Rhine called Schloss Drache which he is turning into a theatre museum. They also meet a widow and flower grower, Maeve Horton.

Book jacket
Illusion leads to murder as 007 pursues the wrong killer, in John Gardner's twelfth addition to the James Bond series.

When Laura March, on leave from the British Security Service, is murdered in Switzerland with a poison pellet shot from a powerful air rifle, James Bond and Swiss agent Fredericka "Flicka" von Grüsse are called in to investigate. While at Laura's funeral, Bond notices among the wreaths a perfect white rose, its petals tipped blood-red and an ambiguous note wired to the stem. His investigation reveals an identical rose and note at the funerals of four high-profile personalities, all assassinated with a week.

With no group claiming responsibility for the deaths, Bond focuses on Laura's case as an entrée to tracking the murderous spree. He uncovers her recently dissolved love affair with the world-famous actor David Dragonpol, now an eccentric collector of theatre memorabilia living in a castle on the Rhine. Bond and Flicka go undercover to search the castle for clues, and in the garden find roses just like the ones at each of the funerals.

Their joint discovery leads to a manhunt in which the identity of the serial killer is revealed. The action reaches its climax outside Paris, in EuroDisney.

Publication history
 UK first hardback edition: July 1993 Hodder & Stoughton
 U.S. first hardback edition: May 1993 Putnam
 UK first paperback edition: May 1994 Coronet Books
 U.S. first paperback edition: June 1994 Berkley Books

See also
 Outline of James Bond

References

1993 British novels
James Bond books
Novels by John Gardner (British writer)
Hodder & Stoughton books
Novels set in Germany
Novels set in Switzerland
Novels set in Paris
Novels set in Washington, D.C.